Ars is a 1959 French film short written and directed by Jacques Demy.

References

External links

1959 films
French short documentary films
Films directed by Jacques Demy
1950s French films